The 1963 season of the Paraguayan Primera División, the top category of Paraguayan football, was played by 11 teams. The national champions were Cerro Porteño.

Results

Relegation play-offs

Promotion/relegation play-offs

External links
Paraguay 1963 season at RSSSF

Para
Paraguayan Primera División seasons
Primera